The Canadian Society for Digital Humanities is a Canadian scholarly association. Its full name is Society for Digital Humanities/Société canadienne des humanités numériques (CSDH-SCHN). The CSDH-SCHN was founded as the COCH/COSH or Consortium for Computers in the Humanities/ Consortium pour ordinateurs en sciences humaines in 1986. The organization changed its name to the Society for Digital Humanities/Société pour l'étude des médias interactifs (SDH/SEMI), but became CSDH-SCHN after 2007, when it was enfranchised by the Alliance of Digital Humanities Organizations.

The CSDH-SCHN meets every year as part of the Congress of the Social Sciences and Humanities organized by the Canadian Federation for the Humanities and Social Sciences.

Our objective is to draw together humanists who are engaged in digital and computer-assisted research, teaching, and creation. The society fosters work in the digital humanities in Canada's two official languages, and champions interaction between Canada's anglophone and francophone communities, in all areas reflected by its diverse membership: providing opportunities for publication, presentation, and collaboration; supporting a number of educational venues and international initiatives; acting as an advisory and lobbying force to local, national, and international research and research-funding bodies; working with allied organisations; and beyond.

See also

 List of learned societies
 Canadian Federation for the Humanities and Social Sciences

External links
 Canadian Federation for the Humanities and Social Sciences
 CSDH-SCHN
 Alliance of Digital Humanities Organizations

References

Higher education in Canada
History organizations based in Canada
Professional associations based in Canada